Sir John St Aubyn, 3rd Baronet (1696–1744), of Clowance and St Michael's Mount, Cornwall, was an English Tory politician who sat in the House of Commons from 1722 to 1744.

Early life
St Aubyn was born on 27 September 1696, the eldest son of Sir John St. Aubyn, 2nd Baronet and his wife  Mary de la Hay, daughter and coheiress of Peter de la Hay of Westminster. He succeeded his father to the baronetcy on 20 June 1714.  He was entered as gentleman-commoner at Exeter College, Oxford, on 10 June 1718, and created M.A. on 19 July 1721.

Career
St Aubyn was returned unopposed as Member of Parliament for Cornwall at the  1722 British general election and was returned unopposed again in 1727, 1734 and 1741. In the House of Commons St. Aubyn spoke infrequently. Joining the opposition against Robert Walpole, he was hostile to the Septennial Act, and the employment of Hanoverian troops with the standing army. On 9 March 1742, after Walpole's fall from power, he seconded Lord Limerick's motion for a committee to inquire into the transactions of the previous two decades, which was defeated by 244 votes to 242. A fortnight later he seconded a motion by Limerick for a secret committee of 21 to examine Walpole's official acts during the last ten years, and it was carried by 252 votes to 245. In the polling for the committee he led with 518 votes, but declined to preside. He is said to have also declined a seat on the Board of Admiralty.

St. Aubyn was on close terms with William Borlase, and was a friend and correspondent of Alexander Pope.   Jacobite sympathies were at one remove: he briefed Thomas Carte on parliamentary debates, for the benefit of the Old Pretender, who gained an exaggerated view of St. Aubyn's effective support.

Family and legacy
St Aubyn married Catherine Morice, daughter and coheiress of Sir Nicholas Morice, 2nd Baronet, at St James's Church, Piccadilly on 3 October 1725. The match brought him £10,000 in cash and the manor of Stoke-Damerel, including Devonport. She died at Clowance in Crowan on 16 June 1740, and was buried in Crowan church. 

St Aubyn died of fever at Pencarrow, Egloshayle, Cornwall, on 15 August 1744, and was buried in a granite vault with his wife in Crowan church on 23 August.
They had five children.

References

Attribution

1696 births
1744 deaths
Baronets in the Baronetage of England
Alumni of Exeter College, Oxford
Members of the Parliament of Great Britain for constituencies in Cornwall
British MPs 1722–1727
British MPs 1727–1734
British MPs 1734–1741
British MPs 1741–1747
Burials in Cornwall